Glenoides lenticuligera is a species of geometrid moth in the family Geometridae. It is found in North America.

The MONA or Hodges number for Glenoides lenticuligera is 6444.

References

Further reading

 

Boarmiini
Articles created by Qbugbot
Moths described in 1973